Swannell may refer to:

 Swannell Ranges, a subrange of the Omenica Ranges in British Columbia, Canada
 Mount Swannell, a summit in the Fawnie Range of the Nechako Plateau of British Columbia

 Swannell River, a river of British Columbia

People with the surname
Blair Swannell (1875–1915), English rugby union player
Frank Swannell (1880–1969), Canadian surveyor, after whom the Canadian geographic items are named
John Swannell (born 1946), English photographer
Robert Swannell (born 1950), British businessman